Sant Gervasi is a railway station located under Plaça Molina in the Sarrià-Sant Gervasi district of Barcelona. It is served by line L6 of the Barcelona Metro and lines S1 and S2 of the Metro del Vallès commuter rail system,. All these lines are operated by Ferrocarrils de la Generalitat de Catalunya, who also run the station.

It is located close to Plaça Molina station, on metro line L7. The two stations are connected by a pedestrian tunnel, within the fare paid area of both stations.

Due to the renovations at the Gràcia station, commuters wishing to take the L7 line to Avinguda Tibidabo must access it by switching from Sant Gervasi to Plaça Molina.

The first Sant Gervasi station opened in 1863 and was situated in a cutting with a station building at ground level. The current station was opened in 1929, when the line serving the station was put underground.

See also
List of Barcelona Metro stations
List of railway stations in Barcelona

References

External links
 
 Information and photos about the station at Trenscat.com
 Information and photos about the station at TransporteBCN.es

Stations on the Barcelona–Vallès Line
Barcelona Metro line 6 stations
Railway stations in Spain opened in 1863
Railway stations in Spain opened in 1929
Transport in Sarrià-Sant Gervasi
Railway stations located underground in Spain